Khawlan District is a district of the Sanaa Governorate, Yemen. , the district had a population of 28,925 inhabitants.

References

Districts of Sanaa Governorate
Khwlan District